Billy Snoddy is a unionist politician in Northern Ireland.

He was a member of Newtownabbey Borough Council from 1989 to 1997, and was elected to the Northern Ireland Forum in 1996

References

Year of birth missing (living people)
Living people
Democratic Unionist Party politicians
Members of the Northern Ireland Forum
Mayors of Newtownabbey